The 1989 Texas Tech Red Raiders football team represented Texas Tech University as a member of the Southwest Conference (SWC) during the 1989 NCAA Division I-A football season. In their third season under head coach Spike Dykes, the Red Raiders compiled a 9–3 record (5–3 against SWC opponents), finished in fourth place in the conference, outscored opponents by a combined total of 360 to 281, defeated Duke in the 1989 All-American Bowl, and were ranked No. 19 in the final AP Poll. The team played its home games at Clifford B. and Audrey Jones Stadium in Lubbock, Texas.

Schedule

References

Texas Tech
Texas Tech Red Raiders football seasons
All-American Bowl champion seasons
Texas Tech Red Raiders football